Robert Lindsey Ison (February 25, 1919 – September 26, 1989) was a college football player and U. S. Navy veteran. He played as an end for Bill Alexander at Georgia Tech, selected third-team All-American in 1939. He was selected for the all-time Alexander era Tech team.

References

American football ends
Georgia Tech Yellow Jackets football players
1919 births
1989 deaths
People from Atlanta